Frank Thomas Cimorelli (born August 2, 1968) is a former Major League Baseball pitcher.

Cimorelli attended Franklin Delano Roosevelt High School in Hyde Park, New York where he was teammates with Jeff Pierce. He played shortstop in high school and middle infield at Dutchess Community College on days when he was not pitching. At Dutchess, he batted .340 as a sophomore and won seven games as a pitcher. In his only season at Dominican College, he was an honorable mention NAIA All-American. He was drafted in the 37th round of the 1987 Major League Baseball draft, signed for the minimum salary and received a signing bonus of $1,000.

In 1992, Cimorelli set a Minor League Baseball record for pitchers with 65 consecutive games without committing an error. Cimorelli spent five seasons in the minors, including three uninterrupted years with the Springfield Cardinals, before making his Major League debut against the Houston Astros on April 30, 1994. In his final Major League appearance on July 18, 1994, he surrendered four earned runs in a third of an inning against the Houston Astros, setting the stage for the biggest comeback in the history of the Astrodome.

References

External links

1968 births
Living people
Baseball players from New York (state)
Dominican Chargers baseball players
St. Louis Cardinals players
Major League Baseball pitchers
Sportspeople from Poughkeepsie, New York
Dutchess Falcons baseball players
Arkansas Travelers players
El Paso Diablos players
American expatriate baseball players in Mexico
Johnson City Cardinals players
Louisville Redbirds players
New Haven Ravens players
Piratas de Campeche players
Springfield Cardinals players